The area of national forest estate in Ireland has increased to approximately 700,000 hectares as a result of a significant increase in private forest development in the mid-1980s, with the introduction of grant schemes funded by the EU aimed at encouraging private land owners, mainly farmers, to become involved in forestry. Of this, approximately 45% is in private ownership and 55% is in the ownership of Coillte.

During the first 75 years of the 20th century, forestry in Ireland was almost exclusively carried out by the state. By 1985, forest and woodland cover was approximately 420,000 hectares.

Upon the first arrival of humans in Ireland around 12,500 years ago, the entire island was predominantly covered in a blanket of thick woodland. These woodlands consisted largely of oak and pine forests. However, centuries of heavy deforestation meant that by the end of the 19th century, the area of woodland and forest cover in Ireland was estimated to be approximately 69,000 hectares, or 1% of the national land area.

The vast majority of forestry plantings in Ireland are non-native species, chiefly Sitka spruce, with the consequent damage to biodiversity and the environment.

By province and county

Ulster 

 County Antrim
 Carnfunnock Country Park
 Glenariff Forest Park
 Lagan Valley
 Slieveanorra Forest

 County Armagh
 Gosford Forest Park
 Maghery Country Park

 County Cavan
 Dún na Rí Forest Park
 Killykeen Forest Park

 County Donegal
 Ards Forest Park

 County Down
 Castlewellan Forest Park
 Lagan Valley
 Rostrevor Forest
 Tollymore Forest Park

 County Fermanagh
 Crom Estate
 Florence Court Forest Park

 County Londonderry
 Roe Valley Country Park

 County Monaghan
 Dartrey Forest
 Dún na Rí Forest Park

 County Tyrone
 Drum Manor Forest Park

Munster 

 County Cork
Glenbower Wood, Killeagh. 
 The Gearagh
 Glengarriff Forest

 County Kerry
 Killarney National Forest

Leinster 

 County Carlow
 Oak Park Forest Park

 County Dublin
 Barnaslingan Wood
 Carrickgollogan Forest Trail
 Tibradden Wood

 County Meath
 Mullaghmeen Forest

 County Wicklow
 Avondale Forest
 Crone Woods
 Djouce Woods

Connacht 

 County Galway
 Barna Woods
 Coole Park and Garryland Nature Reserve

 County Leitrim
 Glenfarne Demesne

 County Sligo
 Gortarowey Forest Recreation Area
 Hazelwood

See also 

 Forest inventory
 Geography of Ireland

External links 

 Coillte, The Irish Forestry Board
 National Forest Inventory
 Forest Service Northern Ireland
 Native Woodland Trust

 
Forests
Ireland